The South Korea men's national field hockey team represents South Korea in international field hockey competitions.

Their best result in the global stage was a silver at the 2000 Summer Olympics in Sydney. South Korea is consistently ranked as one of the best teams in Asia.

Tournament record

Summer Olympics

World Cup

Asian Games

Asia Cup

Asian Champions Trophy

Hockey Nations Cup

Sultan Azlan Shah Cup

Defunct competitions

Champions Trophy

Champions Challenge I

Hockey World League

*Draws include matches decided on a penalty shoot-out.

Current roster
Squad for the 2023 Men's FIH Hockey World Cup.

Head coach: Sin Seok-gyo

See also
South Korea women's national field hockey team

References

External links

FIH profile

South Korea
Field hockey
National team